The 2008 Florida Atlantic University Owls football team represented Florida Atlantic University in the 2008 NCAA Division I FBS football season. The team was coached by Howard Schnellenberger and played their home games at Lockhart Stadium in Fort Lauderdale, Florida.  The Owls entered the season as defending Sun Belt Conference champions.

Preseason
The Florida Atlantic Owls entered the 2008 NCAA Division I FBS football season defending their conference championship and just one year removed from their first-ever bowl appearance and victory.  The record-setting 2007 team ended the season 8-5 (6-1 SBC).  Quarterback Rusty Smith, a junior, returned with much hype and national recognition.  The 2008 team also returned an overwhelming majority of starters from the conference champion team, as it only lost four seniors (DB Kris Bartels, OL Jarrid Smith, LB Cergile Sincere, DL Josh Pinnick).

In the Preseason Sun Belt Coaches' Poll, the Owls were a clear favorite to repeat as champions.  FAU received 62 total points and 6 first-place votes.

Preseason honors

Preseason Sun Belt Players of the Year
 Sun Belt Conference Player of the Year, Offense: Rusty Smith (QB, Jr.)
 Sun Belt Conference Player of the Year, Defense: Frantz Joseph (LB, Sr.)

Preseason All-Sun Belt honors
 Rusty Smith (QB, Jr.)
 Cortez Gent (WR, Jr.)
 Nick Paris (OL, Sr.)
 Jervonte Jackson (DL, Sr.)
 Robert St. Clair (DL, Sr.)
 Frantz Joseph (LB, Sr.) 
 Tavious Polo (CB, So.)
 Corey Small (CB, Sr.)

Schedule

Awards and honors

Mid-season awards and honors
 Week 12 Sun Belt Conference Player of the Week, Offense: Rusty Smith (QB, Jr.)
 Week 12 Sun Belt Conference Player of the Week, Defense: Corey Small (CB, Sr.)
 Week 14 Sun Belt Conference Player of the Week, Offense: Rusty Smith (QB, Jr.)
 Week 14 Sun Belt Conference Player of the Week, Defense: Frantz Joseph (LB, Sr.)
 2008 Shula Bowl Most Valuable Player: Rusty Smith (QB, Jr.)

Post-season awards and honors

All-Sun Belt honors
 First Team All-Sun Belt Conference:
 Jervonte Jackson (DL, Sr.)
 Frantz Joseph (LB, Sr.)
 Corey Small (CB, Sr.)
 Second Team All-Sun Belt Conference:
 Jamari Grant (TE, Jr.)
 John Rizzo (OL, Sr.)
 Nick Paris (OL, Sr.)
 Charles Pierre (RB, Sr.)

Records broken in 2008
The 2008 football season saw numerous school records broken.

References

Florida Atlantic
Florida Atlantic Owls football seasons
Little Caesars Pizza Bowl champion seasons
Florida Atlantic Owls football